The 2013–14 Lithuanian Handball League season was the 25th season of the Lithuanian Handball League, the top level handball in Lithuania. Nine teams participated in the league. League started at 11 September 2013 and finished on 10 May 2014.

Regular season

Playoffs

Quarterfinals
 (1) Dragūnas Klaipėda - (8) SM Dubysa-Gubernija (29:22, 32:17)
 (2) Almeida-Stronglasas Alytus - (7) Lūšis Kaunas (21:16, 32:22)
 (3) VHC Šviesa - (6) HC Vilnius (32:26, 27:16)
 (4) Ūla Varėna - (5) Granitas Kaunas (21:26, 23:16, 21:28)

Semifinals
 (1) Dragūnas Klaipėda - (5) Granitas Kaunas (29:26, 29:30, 31:25)
 (2) Almeida-Stronglasas Alytus - (3) VHC Šviesa (27:31, 32:22, 20:28)

3rd place game
 (5) Granitas Kaunas - (2) Almeida-Stronglasas Alytus (28:25, 25:26, 25:26)

Final
 (1) Dragūnas Klaipėda - (3) VHC Šviesa (36:29, 30:28, 30:27)

Attendance: 1,355 (450 per match)

References

External links
 Official website

2013–14 domestic handball leagues
2013 in Lithuanian sport
2014 in Lithuanian sport
Lithuanian Handball League seasons